Corey Anderson (born September 22, 1989) is an American mixed martial artist currently competing for Bellator MMA in the light heavyweight division. Prior to signing with Bellator, Anderson competed in the Ultimate Fighting Championship (UFC), where he was the light heavyweight winner on The Ultimate Fighter: Team Edgar vs. Team Penn and achieved success as a top 5 UFC light heavyweight contender. As of November 22, 2022, he is #1 in the Bellator Light Heavyweight Rankings.

Early life

Wrestling career 
Anderson was born and raised in Rockford, Illinois, where he started wrestling in the third grade and later on attended Hononegah Community High School. As a high school wrestler, he earned a third-place finish at the Freestyle State Championships (Illinois High School Association and was also a regional champion. Upon graduation, he went on to attend Lincoln College in Illinois, where during his first year he was forced to take a redshirt due to an injury in his leg. After healing, he placed as high as sixth at the National Championships (claiming All-American status) and took first at the Regional Championships as a freshman and sophomore, in the NJCAA level. After graduating junior college, Anderson transferred to Newberry College to compete in the NCAA Division II level, where he compiled a record of 14 wins and 6 defeats as a junior. He then transferred to the University of Wisconsin–Whitewater. As a senior, Anderson compiled 46 victories and just 5 losses and went on to place second at the 12' NCAA Division III Championships (the highest in the school's history), before graduating with a degree in business administration.

MMA starts 
During his time wrestling at UW-Whitewater, Anderson met at the time's recently crowned Bellator MMA Welterweight Champion and former freestyle wrestling Olympian Ben Askren, who due to Anderson's boxing like mobility when he wrestled, encouraged him to give mixed martial arts a try. After initial refusal, Askren brought Anderson to Roufus MMA by making him think he was going to prepare him for freestyle when it was actually mixed martial arts practice.
Corey was then brought to Fiore MMA in Springfield, IL by Marc Fiore, coach of 9-time UFC Champion Matt Hughes. Here Corey trained with other professional fighters such as Dustin Jacoby, Benny Alloway, James Brum, Jake Hect, Matt Veach, and Brian Foster. Following the closing of Fiore MMA, Corey and other fighters opened up The Kennel Fight Club in Springfield, IL. It was here that his coach, MMA competitor Bobby Brents, pushed Corey to try out for the Ultimate Fighter.

Mixed martial arts career

The Ultimate Fighter
Anderson was revealed as one of the cast members of the nineteenth season of The Ultimate Fighter, coached by Frankie Edgar and BJ Penn, on March 25, 2014. In the elimination rounds to determine who got into the TUF house, Anderson fought and defeated Kelly Anundson by unanimous decision after two rounds. He was then chosen as the first pick for Team Edgar's light heavyweights.

In the quarter-finals, Anderson fought Team Penn's, Josh Clark. Anderson utilized his wrestling to control the majority of the bout, resulting in a majority decision win. Anderson next fought fellow Team Edgar teammate, Patrick Walsh, in the semi-finals. He defeated Walsh by unanimous decision to secure his spot at the finale.

Ultimate Fighting Championship
Anderson faced Matt Van Buren in the light heavyweight finals on July 6, 2014, at The Ultimate Fighter 19 Finale. He quickly won the bout via TKO just 61 seconds into the first round to become the light heavyweight tournament winner. His 61-second first-round TKO marked the fastest finish ever to the finale of The Ultimate Fighter show.

Anderson was expected to face Gian Villante on December 6, 2014 at UFC 181. However, Villante pulled out of the fight citing an injury and was replaced by Jonathan Wilson. A few days later, it was announced that Wilson was forced out of the fight and undefeated newcomer Justin Jones would take his place. He won the fight via unanimous decision.

A rescheduled bout with Villante took place on April 18, 2015 at UFC on Fox 15. Anderson lost the fight via TKO in the third round.  Despite the loss, he was awarded a bonus for Fight of the Night.

Anderson faced Jan Błachowicz on September 5, 2015 at UFC 191. He won the fight by unanimous decision.

Anderson stepped up to face Fábio Maldonado on November 7, 2015 at UFC Fight Night 77, filling in for an injured Tom Lawlor. He won the one sided fight by unanimous decision.

Anderson faced Tom Lawlor on March 5, 2016 at UFC 196. He won the fight by unanimous decision.

Anderson faced Maurício Rua on May 14, 2016 at UFC 198. Rua was awarded a split decision victory.

Anderson faced Sean O'Connell on December 9, 2016 at UFC Fight Night 102. He won the fight by TKO in the second round.

Anderson faced Jimi Manuwa on March 18, 2017 in the main event at UFC Fight Night 107. He lost the fight via knockout in the first round.

Anderson was expected to face Patrick Cummins on November 4, 2017 at UFC 217. However, on October 17, Cummins pulled out due to a resistant staph infection. He was replaced by Ovince Saint Preux. After losing the first round and winning the second due to his wrestling, Anderson lost the fight via head kick knockout early in the third round.

Anderson faced Patrick Cummins on April 21, 2018 UFC Fight Night 128. He won the fight via unanimous decision.

Anderson faced Glover Teixeira on July 22, 2018 at UFC Fight Night 134, replacing injured Ilir Latifi He won the fight via unanimous decision.

Anderson faced Ilir Latifi on December 29, 2018 at UFC 232. He won the fight via unanimous decision.

Anderson faced Johnny Walker on November 2, 2019 at UFC 244. He won the fight by technical knockout in the first round.  This win earned him the Performance of the Night award. During the post fight celebration, Anderson taunted and screamed at Walker and shoved the referee away resulting in a fine of $10,000 from New York State Athletic Commission for "unsportsmanlike and disorderly conduct".

Anderson faced Jan Błachowicz on February 15, 2020 at UFC Fight Night 167 in a rematch. He lost the fight via first round knockout.

Bellator MMA
On August 7, 2020, it was announced that Anderson had signed a multi-fight deal with Bellator MMA after being granted his release from his UFC contract. He made his promotional debut against Melvin Manhoef at Bellator 251 on November 5, 2020. He was victorious via second round technical knockout.

On February 9, 2021, it was announced that Anderson would be competing in the Bellator Light Heavyweight World Grand Prix. He is scheduled to face promotional newcomer and former Absolute Championship Akhmat Light Heavyweight champion Dovletdzhan Yagshimuradov in the quarterfinal round on April 9 at Bellator 256. On March 26, it was announced that the bout would be moved to Bellator 257 on April 16. Anderson won the bout via third-round technical knockout.

In the semi-finals of the Grand Prix, Anderson faced Ryan Bader on October 16, 2021 at Bellator 268. He won the fight via TKO early in round one.

In the finals of the Bellator Light Heavyweight World Grand Prix Tournament, Anderson took on reigning champion Vadim Nemkov for the 205-pound title as well as the $1 million prize on April 15, 2022 at Bellator 277. The fight ended in a no contest after an accidental clash of heads resulted in a cut on Nemkov's left brow that rendered him unable to continue.

The rematch of the finals took place on November 18, 2022 at Bellator 288. Anderson wasn't able to take down Nemkov, going 0 for 16, and was picked apart from distance on the way to losing the bout via unanimous decision.

Championships and accomplishments 
 Ultimate Fighting Championship
 The Ultimate Fighter 19 Tournament Winner
 Fight of the Night (One time) 
Performance of the Night (One time) 
 MMAJunkie.com
 2015 April Fight of the Month vs. Gian Villante

Mixed martial arts record

|-
| Loss
|align=center|16–6 (1)
|Vadim Nemkov
|Decision (unanimous) 
|Bellator 288
|
|align=center|5
|align=center|5:00
|Chicago, Illinois, United States
||
|-
|NC
|align=center|
|Vadim Nemkov
|No Contest (accidental clash of heads)
|Bellator 277 
|
|align=center|3
|align=center|4:55
|San Jose, California, United States
|
|-
|Win
|align=center|16–5
|Ryan Bader
|TKO (punches)
|Bellator 268 
|
|align=center|1
|align=center|0:51
|Phoenix, Arizona, United States 
|
|-
|Win
|align=center|15–5
|
|TKO (punches and elbows)
|Bellator 257
|
|align=center|3
|align=center|2:15
|Uncasville, Connecticut, United States 
|
|-
|Win
|align=center|14–5
|Melvin Manhoef
|TKO (elbows)
|Bellator 251
|
|align=center|2
|align=center|2:34
|Uncasville, Connecticut, United States
|
|-
| Loss
|align=center|13–5
|Jan Błachowicz
|KO (punch)
|UFC Fight Night: Anderson vs. Błachowicz 2 
|
|align=center|1
|align=center|3:08
|Rio Rancho, New Mexico, United States
|
|-
|Win
|align=center|13–4
|Johnny Walker
|TKO (punches)
|UFC 244 
|
|align=center|1
|align=center|2:07
|New York City, New York, United States
|
|-
|Win
|align=center|12–4
|Ilir Latifi
|Decision (unanimous)
|UFC 232 
|
|align=center|3
|align=center|5:00
|Inglewood, California, United States
|  
|-
|Win
|align=center|11–4
|Glover Teixeira
|Decision (unanimous)
|UFC Fight Night: Shogun vs. Smith 
|
|align=center|3
|align=center|5:00
|Hamburg, Germany
|
|-
|Win
|align=center|10–4
|Patrick Cummins
|Decision (unanimous)
|UFC Fight Night: Barboza vs. Lee
|
|align=center|3
|align=center|5:00
|Atlantic City, New Jersey, United States
|
|-
|Loss
|align=center|9–4
|Ovince Saint Preux
|KO (head kick)
|UFC 217
|
|align=center|3
|align=center|1:25
|New York City, New York, United States
|
|-
|Loss
|align=center|9–3
|Jimi Manuwa
|KO (punch)
|UFC Fight Night: Manuwa vs. Anderson
|
|align=center|1
|align=center|3:05
|London, England
| 
|-
|Win
|align=center|9–2
|Sean O'Connell 
|TKO (punches)
|UFC Fight Night: Lewis vs. Abdurakhimov 
|
|align=center|2
|align=center|2:36
|Albany, New York, United States 
|
|-
|Loss
|align=center|8–2
|Maurício Rua
|Decision (split)
|UFC 198
|
|align=center|3
|align=center|5:00
|Curitiba, Brazil
| 
|-
|Win
|align=center|8–1
|Tom Lawlor
|Decision (unanimous) 
|UFC 196
|
|align=center|3
|align=center|5:00
|Las Vegas, Nevada, United States
|
|-
|Win
|align=center|7–1
|Fábio Maldonado
|Decision (unanimous)
|UFC Fight Night: Belfort vs. Henderson 3
|
|align=center|3
|align=center|5:00
|São Paulo, Brazil
| 
|-
|Win
|align=center|6–1
|Jan Błachowicz
|Decision (unanimous)
|UFC 191
|
|align=center|3
|align=center|5:00
|Las Vegas, Nevada, United States
|
|-
|Loss
|align=center|5–1
|Gian Villante
|TKO (punches)
|UFC on Fox: Machida vs. Rockhold 
|
|align=center|3
|align=center|4:18
|Newark, New Jersey, United States
|
|-
|Win
|align=center|5–0
|Justin Jones
|Decision (unanimous)
|UFC 181
|
|align=center|3
|align=center|5:00
|Las Vegas, Nevada, United States
|
|-
|Win
|align=center|4–0
|Matt Van Buren
|TKO (punches)
|The Ultimate Fighter: Team Edgar vs. Team Penn Finale
|
|align=center|1
|align=center|1:01
|Las Vegas, Nevada, United States
|
|-
|Win
|align=center|3–0
|Stephen Flanagan
|TKO (punches)
|MMA Xtreme: Fists Will Fly
|
|align=center|1
|align=center|3:03
|Evansville, Indiana, United States
|
|-
|Win
|align=center|2–0
|Myron Dennis
|Decision (unanimous)
|XFC: Vengeance 
|
|align=center|5
|align=center|5:00
|Grant, Oklahoma, United States
|
|-
|Win
|align=center|1–0
|J.R. Briones
|TKO (punches)
|NAFC: Battleground
|
|align=center|1
|align=center|3:01
|Milwaukee, Wisconsin, United States
|

See also
 List of current Bellator fighters
 List of male mixed martial artists

References

External links
 
 

1989 births
Living people
African-American mixed martial artists
American male mixed martial artists
Light heavyweight mixed martial artists
Mixed martial artists utilizing collegiate wrestling
Mixed martial artists utilizing Brazilian jiu-jitsu
Mixed martial artists from Illinois
Ultimate Fighting Championship male fighters
Bellator male fighters
American male sport wrestlers
Newberry Wolves wrestlers
Lincoln Lynx wrestlers
Wisconsin–Whitewater Warhawks wrestlers
American practitioners of Brazilian jiu-jitsu
21st-century African-American sportspeople
20th-century African-American people
People from Rockton, Illinois